Moqri Kola or Moqri Kala or Maqri Kala may refer to:
 Moqri Kola, Babol
 Moqri Kola, Babolsar